The 2020–21 season was the 115th season in existence of Sporting Clube de Portugal and the club's 87th consecutive season in the top flight of Portuguese football. In addition to the domestic league, Sporting CP participated in this season's editions of the Taça de Portugal and the UEFA Europa League. The club also qualified for the Taça da Liga, depending on the league results. The season covered the period from 26 July 2020 to 30 June 2021.

Sporting won the 2020–21 Primeira Liga with two matches remaining, following a 1–0 home win against Boavista, and thus became Portuguese champions for the 19th time in their history, and for the first time since the 2001–02 season. In this season, Sporting set a league record for the longest unbeaten run in a single season with 32 matches in a row (25 wins and seven draws) out of 34 matches.

Players

First-team squad

Other players under contract

Out on loan

Transfers

In

Out

Pre-season and friendlies

Competitions

Overview

Primeira Liga

League table

Results summary

Results by round

Matches
The league fixtures were announced on 28 August 2020.

Taça de Portugal

Taça da Liga

UEFA Europa League

Statistics

Appearances and goals

|-
!colspan=16 style=background:#dcdcdc; text-align:center|Goalkeepers

|-
!colspan=16 style=background:#dcdcdc; text-align:center|Defenders

|-
!colspan=16 style=background:#dcdcdc; text-align:center|Midfielders

|-
!colspan=16 style=background:#dcdcdc; text-align:center|Forwards

|-
!colspan=16 style=background:#dcdcdc; text-align:center|Players who have made an appearance this season but have left the club

Goalscorers

Notes

References

External links

Sporting CP seasons
Sporting CP
Sporting CP
Portuguese football championship-winning seasons